It's a Beautiful Thing is the third solo studio album by American rapper Keith Murray. It was released on January 12, 1999 via Jive Records, making it his final record for the label. Recording sessions took place at Mirror Image Recording Studios in Dix Hills, New York. Production was handled entirely by Erick Sermon, who also served as executive producer. It features guest appearances from Déjà Vu, Canibus, Erick Sermon, LL Cool J, Redman and Too $hort. The album peaked at number thirty-nine on the Billboard 200 and number nine on the Top R&B/Hip-Hop Albums chart in the US.

The recording of the album began during the difficult times of Murray's legal and financial troubles, along with his desire to leave the label. However, the album was unfinished when Murray went into incarceration, with the label deciding to complete and release the album despite Murray's disapproval. AllMusic's Stephen Thomas Erlewine considered the album to be a rather indistinctive one in Murray's discography, but did state that "there's enough to make It's a Beautiful Thing a reasonably entertaining listen, even if they aren't enough to make it memorable".

Track listing

Chart history

Album

Singles

Personnel
Information taken from AllMusic.
arranging – Keith Murray, Erick Sermon
assistant engineering – Dave O'Donnell
engineering – Mark Berto, Troy Hightower
executive production – Erick Sermon
mixing – Troy Hightower, Ivan 'Doc' Rodriguez
performer(s) – Canibus, LL Cool J, Redman, Erick Sermon, Too Short
production – Erick Sermon
project coordination – Chris Tricarico

References

External links

1998 albums
Jive Records albums
Keith Murray (rapper) albums
Albums produced by Erick Sermon